The 1981 NCAA Division I Tennis Championships were the 36th annual tournaments to determine the national champions of NCAA men's college tennis. Matches were played during May 1981 at the Dan Magill Tennis Complex in Athens, Georgia on the campus of the University of Georgia. A total of three championships were contested: men's team, singles, and doubles. A women's tournament would be introduced in 1982.

The men's team championship was retained by the Stanford Cardinal, their sixth team national title. Stanford defeated UCLA in the final round, 5–1. The men's singles title was won by Tim Mayotte from Stanford, and the men's doubles title was won by David Pate and Karl Richter from Texas Christian University.

Team tournament

See also
NCAA Division I Women's Tennis Championship (from 1982)
NCAA Men's Division II Tennis Championship
NCAA Men's Division III Tennis Championship

References

External links
List of NCAA Men's Tennis Champions
List of NCAA Women's Tennis Champions

NCAA Division I tennis championships
NCAA Division I Tennis Championships
NCAA Division I Tennis Championships
NCAA Division I Tennis Championships